Plymouth Township, officially the Charter Township of Plymouth, is a charter township in Wayne County in the U.S. state of Michigan. The population was 27,524 at the 2010 census. The city of Plymouth is surrounded by the township but is administered autonomously.

Geography

Education
Plymouth Township is served by the Plymouth-Canton Community Schools. P-CCS serves most of Canton & Plymouth Charter Townships in Wayne County, and portions of Northville Charter Township (also in Wayne County), Salem Township and Superior Charter Township (the latter two in Washtenaw County).

Government
The primary governing body of Plymouth Township consists of a board of trustees. The membership of this board consists of the three primary elected executives (Supervisor, Treasurer, and Clerk), plus four additional at-large trustees. All seven members are elected to four-year terms that coincide with the United States Presidential election cycle.

In 1995 Plymouth Township and the City of Plymouth consolidated their fire departments with the township controlling fire services. The township received $1 million from the city, making up 25% of the consolidated fire department's budget. This agreement is no longer in effect, the city having withdrawn.

Demographics

As of the census of 2000, there were 27,798 people, 10,757 households, and 7,680 families residing in the township. The racial makeup of the township was 92.38% White, 2.96% African American, 0.27% Native American, 2.73% Asian, 0.01% Pacific Islander, 0.40% from other races, and 1.25% from two or more races.  1.64% of the population were Hispanic or Latino of any race. 17.7% were of German, 13.8% Polish, 13.1% Irish, 9.5% English and 7.1% Italian ancestry according to Census 2000.

There were 10,757 households, out of which 30.7% had children under the age of 18 living with them, 63.1% were married couples living together, 6.1% had a female householder with no husband present, and 28.6% were non-families. 24.7% of all households were made up of individuals, and 9.2% had someone living alone who was 65 years of age or older.  The average household size was 2.49 and the average family size was 3.01.

In the township the population was spread out, with 22.6% under the age of 18, 6.5% from 18 to 24, 30.4% from 25 to 44, 28.2% from 45 to 64, and 12.3% who were 65 years of age or older.  The median age was 40 years. For every 100 females, there were 100.9 males.  For every 100 females age 18 and over, there were 100.6 males.

According to a 2007 estimate, the median income for a household in the township was $90,780, and the median income for a family was $111,006. Males had a median income of $64,583 versus $36,182 for females. The per capita income for the township was $37,081.  About 0.9% of families and 1.8% of the population were below the poverty line, including 1.4% of those under age 18 and 1.8% of those age 65 or over.

Highways
 
  (joins to run concurrent with Interstate 96 within Plymouth Township)

Economy
Among the companies based in Plymouth Township are Aisin World Corp. of America, Hella Corporate Center USA, Johnson Controls Automotive Experience and Metaldyne.

Sports
Plymouth Township was home to the Ontario Hockey League's Plymouth Whalers, one of three American teams in the OHL and one of two in Michigan. The Whalers played in Compuware Arena, now known as USA Hockey Arena. After the 2014–2015 season, the team was sold and became the Flint Firebirds. The arena hosted the 2017 Women's Ice Hockey World Championships.

Plymouth Township was home to the indoor soccer team the Detroit Ignition of the Xtreme Soccer League. The Ignition played in the championship finals all three years of its existence. The team was disbanded after the 2008–2009 season. The Ignition played at Compuware Arena.

Photo gallery

References

External links
Charter Township of Plymouth official website

 
Charter townships in Michigan
Townships in Wayne County, Michigan
Former census-designated places in Michigan
Populated places established in 1827
1827 establishments in Michigan Territory